The 1976 All-SEC football team consists of American football players selected to the All-Southeastern Conference (SEC) chosen by various selectors for the 1976 NCAA Division I football season.

Offensive selections

Receivers 
 Larry Seivers, Tennessee (AP-1, UPI-1)
 Wes Chandler, Florida (AP-1)
 Gene Washington, Georgia (AP-2)
 Stanley Morgan, Tennessee (AP-2)

Tight ends
 Ozzie Newsome, Alabama (AP-1, UPI-1)
 Jimmy Stephens, Florida (AP-2)

Tackles 
 Mike Wilson, Georgia (AP-1, UPI-1)
 Warren Bryant, Kentucky (AP-1, UPI-1)
 K. J. Lazenby, Alabama (AP-2)
 Bobby Dugas, LSU (AP-2)
 David Forrester, Florida (AP-2)

Guards 
 Joel Parrish, Georgia (AP-1, UPI-1)
 Dave Gerasimchuk, Alabama (AP-1)
 Mickey Marvin, Tennessee (UPI-1)
 Sam Nichols, Mississippi State (AP-2)
 Dave Ostrowski, Auburn (AP-2)

Centers 
 Richard Keys, Mississippi State (AP-1, UPI-1)
 Robbie Moore, Florida (AP-2)

Quarterbacks 
 Ray Goff, Georgia (AP-1, UPI-1)
 Phil Gargis, Auburn (AP-2)

Running backs 
 Terry Robiskie, LSU (AP-1, UPI-1)
 Kevin McLee, Georgia (AP-1, UPI-1)
 Stanley Morgan, Tennessee (UPI-1)
 Johnny Davis, Alabama (AP-2)
 Dennis Johnson, Mississippi State (AP-2)

Placekickers
 Allan Leavitt, Georgia (AP-1)
 Neil O'Donoghue, Auburn (AP-2)

Defensive selections

Ends 
 Art Still, Kentucky (AP-1, UPI-1)
 Lew Sibley, LSU (AP-1)
 Dickey Clark, Georgia (UPI-1)
 Paul Harris, Alabama (AP-2)
 Jeff McCollum, Auburn (AP-2)

Tackles 
 A. J. Duhe, LSU (AP-1, UPI-1)
 Charles Hannah, Alabama (AP-1)
 Bob Baumhower, Alabama (AP-2, UPI-1)
 Darrell Carpenter, Florida (AP-2)

Middle guards
 Harvey Hull, Mississippi State (AP-1, UPI-1)

Linebackers 
 Andy Spiva, Tennessee (AP-1, UPI-1)
 Ben Zambiasi, Georgia (AP-1, UPI-1)
 Ray Costic, Mississippi State (AP-1, UPI-1)
 Kem Coleman, Ole Miss (AP-2)
 Freddie Smith, Auburn (AP-2)
 Jon Streete, LSU (AP-2)
 Jim Kovach, Kentucky (AP-2)

Backs 
 Bill Krug, Georgia (AP-1, UPI-1)
 Stan Black, Mississippi State (AP-1, UPI-1)
 Clinton Burrell, LSU (AP-1)
 Alvin Cowans, Florida (AP-2, UPI-1)
 Brenard Wilson, Vanderbilt (AP-2)
 Mike Siganos, Kentucky (AP-2)
 Charlie Moss, Ole Miss (AP-2)

Punters 
 Craig Colquitt, Tennessee (AP-1)
 Clyde Baumgartner, Auburn (AP-2)

Key
AP = Associated Press

UPI = United Press International

Bold = Consensus first-team selection by both AP and UPI

See also
1976 College Football All-America Team

References

All-SEC
All-SEC football teams